Geir Ludvig Fevang (born 17 November 1980) is a retired Norwegian football midfielder who last played for Sandefjord. He previously played for Fevang FK, IL Runar, Sandefjord Fotball, IK Start, Lokeren and Haugesund.

Career
Fevang came to IK Start in 2006, and had previously played for the clubs Sandefjord Fotball, Fevang FK and IL Runar. In August 2010, he signed for the Belgian club Lokeren. In March 2012 he moved back to Norway, and signed for FK Haugesund.

After three season, he moved back to his first senior club, Sandefjord, who had been promoted to the 2015 Tippeligaen. After the 2016 season he retired to become Sandefjord's assistant manager.

Career statistics

Honours
Lokeren
Belgian Cup: 2011–12

References

External links
Club bio
Current season statistics from Verdens Gang

1980 births
Living people
People from Sandefjord
Norwegian footballers
IL Runar footballers
Sandefjord Fotball players
IK Start players
K.S.C. Lokeren Oost-Vlaanderen players
FK Haugesund players
Eliteserien players
Norwegian First Division players
Belgian Pro League players
Norwegian expatriate footballers
Expatriate footballers in Belgium
Norwegian expatriate sportspeople in Belgium
Association football midfielders
Sportspeople from Vestfold og Telemark